Astana Platform was created after several meetings in Astana between members of the Syrian opposition forces. The platform is headed by the Syrian politician Randa Kassis.

Timeline
 9 April 2015: At a press conference during the Syria talks in Moscow, Kassis called on the Kazakh President Nursultan Nazarbayev to host the Syrian opposition for a new round of negotiations due to Kazakhstan's neutrality and good relations with the permanent members of the UN Security Council.
 21 April 2015: Nazarbayev accepts to host the new round of negotiations between the Syrian opposition forces.
 1 May 2015: Kazakh Foreign Minister Erlan Idrisov and Kassis set up a political platform to assemble Syrian opposition members in the Kazakh capital Astana, which will later be known as the "Astana Platform".
 25–27 May 2015: First round of negotiations mediated by Idrisov.
28 May 2015: Opposition forces issue a joint statement calling for a gradual political transition of power, the withdrawal of all foreign insurgents involved in the conflict, and the release of all political prisoners. They also requested that Kazakhstan agree to host them again for a second round of negotiations.
 17–18 September 2015: Center of Political and Foreign Affairs (CPFA), headed by Fabien Baussart, organises a conference entitled " Kazakhstan Peace Talks " with the Kazakh government in Astana. The conference participants were multiple Nobel Peace Prize Laureates and other renowned politicians, Kazakh politicians including President Nazarbayev, Fabien Baussart and Randa Kassis. During the conference, Kassis asked Nazarbayev to host a second round of negotiations in October, which he accepted.
 2–4 October 2015: Second round of negotiations between Syrian opposition forces headed by the Secretary of State of Kazakhstan Gulshar Abdeskalkova and mediated by Baussart and the deputy Foreign Minister of Kazakhstan Askar Mussinov.
5 October 2015: The participants of the second round of negotiations release a joint statement calling for a reform of the Syrian constitution and the electoral process.
18 November 2015: The Special Envoy of the President of the Russian Federation and Deputy Foreign Minister Mikhail Bogdanov met with Randa Kassis, the head of the Astana platform. Two parties exchanged views on developments in the situation in Syria. They discussed ways to intensify efforts to launch the political process based on the Geneva Declaration for the process of settling the Syrian crisis on 30 June 2012.
 18 February 2016: The Secretary-General of the League of Arab States, Nabil El-Arabi, met with Randa Kassis, President of the Pluralistic Society Movement and Astana platform, in his office in Cairo. they discussed the process of seeking a political solution.
 10 March 2016: Russian Foreign Minister Sergey Lavrov met with Randa Kassisin Moscow. The meeting allowed the two sides to exchange opinions on the ongoing negotiations between the Opposition and the Syrian regim in Geneva under the aegis of the UN.
25 April 2016: Randa Kassis met with Mr. Gennadi Gatilov, Deputy Minister of Foreign Affairs of the Russian Federation in Geneva. Both sides exchanged opinions on the course and prospects of the intra-Syrian negotiating.
25 November 2016: The President of Astana platform met with Donald Trump Jr. in Paris to discussed the situation in Syria
 15 February 2017: Astana platform leader Randa Kassis met with Kazakh Foreign Minister Kirat Abdurahmanov in the Kazakh capital, Astana to discuss the latest developments related to Astana negotiations and ways to enhance efforts to find a solution to the Syrian crisis.
 25-26 March 2017:  the Astana political platform invited numerous Syrian academics, constitutionalists and political figures in order to start drafting a new constitution for Syria.25 April 2017: Randa Kassis, the leader of the Astana platform, met with Russian Deputy Foreign Minister Gennadi Gatilov at the Russian mission headquarters in Geneva, Switzerland. Both parties had an engaged discussion of the developments in Syria.
 10-13 July 2017: The draft of the Syrian was completed with the help of many Syrian constitutionalists, the French constitutionalist Xavier Latour and with the presence of the former Italian Foreign Minister Giulio Terzi and the former Foreign Affairs of Turkey Yasar Yakis.
 30 November 2017: Randa Kassis, the leader of the Astana platform, discussed with Staffan de Mistura, the latest developments in Syria. Both sides discussed the preparations preceding the Syrian National Dialogue Conference in Sochi.
 18 June 2018: Randa Kassis met with the Russian delegation, represented by President Putin's Special Envoy for Syria Alexander Lavrentiev; the Deputy Minister of Foreign Affairs Sergey Vershinin and Gen. Sergey Afanaseiv in order to exchange views regarding the situation in Syria and the application of the resolution voted by the Congress of Sochi.
 26 October 2018: Randa Kassis among other members of the Syrian opposition presented a "road map" to peace. The meeting was held in Rome under the aegis of Sant'Egidio.
 25 February 2019:  Meeting between Beibut Alamkulov, Minister of Foreign Affairs of Kazakhstan, Randa Kassis and Fabien Bausart, President of CPFA. They had a discussion regarding the situation in Syria and the need to seek a negotiated political solution in respect for plurality.
 16 March 2019: Randa Kassis met with the US Special Envoy for Syria Joel Rayburn, to discuss the need to support a constructive and balanced political solution in Syria.

Establishment of a Syrian constitutional Commission

In March 2017, the Astana political platform invited numerous Syrian academics, constitutionalists and political figures in order to start drafting a new constitution for Syria. 

The draft of the Syrian constitution was completed in July 2017  with the help of French constitutionalist expert Xavier Latour, former Minister of Foreign Affairs of Turkey Yasar Yakis and former Minister of Foreign Affairs of Italy Giulio Terzi.

Sochi Conference
On 13 January 2018, Sochi hosted the Syrian National Congress, where numerous Syrian ethnic representatives and opposition forces – including the Astana platform – met to discuss various issues. Kassis highlighted the importance of creating a constitutional committee in order to facilitate the peace process, which the UN and Astana troika – Russian, Iran and Turkey – later agreed to.

Gallery

References

Politics of Syria
Syrian opposition
Syrian peace process
Kazakhstan–Syria relations